Georges Martin (9 May 1844, Paris – 1 October 1916, Paris) was a French doctor, politician and Freemason.

Masonic Membership
He was initiated on 21 March 1879 into the Union et Bienfaisance lodge of the Grande Loge de France.  He was one of the founders of France's "Symbolic Scottish Grand Lodge".  From 1890, he worked unsuccessfully for women's initiation within the male jurisdictions.

Founding of Co-Masonry
He assisted in the initiation of Maria Deraismes on 14 January 1882 into Les Libres Penseurs lodge in Pecq, and together, they founded the first mixed-sex lodge in 1893, the Grande Loge Symbolique Écossaise "Le Droit Humain".  This mother-lodge became the basis for the creation of Le Droit Humain lodge, the origins of Co-Masonry; he devoted himself to the national and international development of this from 1883 to 1916.  In 1901, he created "Le Droit Humain"'s Supreme Council under the authority of which all the lodges were placed.

See also
List of Freemasons
Le Droit Humain

External links
 International Order of Freemasonry for Men and Women, LE DROIT HUMAIN
 International Order of Freemasonry for Men and Women, LE DROIT HUMAIN - French Federation
 Detailed account Dr. Martin's Role in founding Co-Masonry

References 

1844 births
1916 deaths
Physicians from Paris
19th-century French physicians
French Freemasons
Senators of Seine (department)